"Boxerbeat" is the debut single by JoBoxers from their album Like Gangbusters. It peaked at number three on the UK Singles Chart in 1983.

References

External links

1983 songs
1983 debut singles
RCA Victor singles
JoBoxers songs